Raymond Conway Benjamin (24 February 1925 – 7 March 2016) was a Roman Catholic bishop. Ordained to the priesthood in 1949, Benjamin served as bishop of the Roman Catholic Diocese of Townsville, Queensland, Australia from 1984 until his retirement in 2000.

At the time of the death in office of his successor, Bishop Michael Putney, and the subsequent vacancy in the Diocese of Townsville, Bishop Benjamin was still living.

See also

References

1925 births
2016 deaths
Roman Catholic bishops of Townsville